Kietrz  is a town in Głubczyce County, Opole Voivodeship, Poland, near the border with the Czech Republic. As of 2019, it has a population of 6,005.

Notable people
Alfons Luczny (1894–1986), Luftwaffe general
Olga Tokarczuk (born 1962), Polish writer, Nobel laureate

Twin towns – sister cities
See twin towns of Gmina Kietrz.

References

External links
 Jewish Community in Kietrz on Virtual Shtetl

Cities in Silesia
Cities and towns in Opole Voivodeship
Głubczyce County

it:Kietrz